Kot Islam is a  Sub tehsil in Khanewal District, Punjab, Pakistan located on the main Jhang-Multan road. Its old name was Mansa Manglani.
Its surrounding areas are Bagar Sargana,  Abdul Hakeem, Qatal Pur and 25 Pul. "Ch Muhammad Rafique Arain" is the chairman of UC kot Islam and Mehar Ali Hiraj is vice Chairman.In this sub Tehsil, there are Govt Girls and boys high school, a sports ground, a river Ravi and lot of grassed area. The main population consists on  main castes i.e Sial, Sahu, Arain, Qureshi, Mughal etc. However other caste like Bhatti, Khokhar, Rajput are also prominent. Kot Islam was included in NA-150 after new constituencies made by ECP. 
People of Kot islam are demanding Post office
Boys and Girls   college 
A hospital of minimum 50 x beds
water filteration plant
Technical college
and other basic right facilities like any other city.

Tehsils of Punjab, Pakistan